Xavier Depraz, né Xavier Marcel Delaruelle (22 April 1926 – 18 October 1994) was a French opera singer and actor.

Life 
Born in Albert (Somme), Depraz was a bass at the Paris Opéra until 1971. He took part in the premieres of operas by Marcel Landowski and Sergei Prokofiev.

Career 
Depraz entered the Conservatoire de Paris in 1947 where he attended the classes of Fernand Francell for singing, Louis Musy for the stage and René Simon for theatre. He participated in the premieres of several operas: Marcel Landowski's Le Rire de Nils Halerius (1951) and Le Fou, Poulenc's Dialogues des Carmélites and, in concert version, Prokofiev's The Fiery Angel (1954). In the 1953 Paris premiere of The Rake's Progress at the Opéra-Comique Depraz was "a splendid Nick Shadow". He also sang in Bartók's Bluebeard's Castle, Verdi's Rigoletto, Mozart's Don Giovanni, Massenet's Don Quichotte and Thaïs among others. For his appearance as Méphistophélès in Monte Carlo in 1959 one reviewer commented "Xavier Depraz, immensely tall, and surprisingly thin and angular for an operatic bass, produced a suitably resonant and cavernous voice, and histrionically was satisfyingly demonic".

He also appeared at the French provincial opera houses, Glyndebourne and Venice, and was appointed a professor of opera at the Conservatoire de Paris in 1973.

In 1971, he began a career as an actor in film and television.

His recordings include Une éducation manquée (Pausanias), Les Pêcheurs de perles (Nourabad), Romeo et Juliette (Frère Laurence), Carmen (Zuniga for Beecham and Haitink), Renard, Dialogues des Carmélites (Le Marquis de la Force) and the Duruflé Requiem.

Depraz died in Saint-Étienne-de-Saint-Geoirs (Isère) on 18 October 1994.

Discography 
1953: Pausanias in Chabrier's Une Éducation manquée conducted by Charles Bruck (Le Chant du Monde)
1953: Nourabad in Bizet's Les Pêcheurs de perles conducted by Jean Fournet (Philips)
1954: Basile in excerpts from Le Barbier de Séville with the Opéra-Comique company under Jules Gressier (Pathé)
1954: Ruprecht in Prokofiev's L'Ange de Feu with the Paris Opera under Charles Bruck (Vega)
1958: Marquis de la Force in Poulenc's Dialogues des Carmélites conducted by Pierre Dervaux (Angel)
1958: Zuniga in Carmen under Thomas Beecham (HMV)
1967: Mephistopheles in excerpts from Faust under Jésus Etcheverry (Vogue)
1968: Frère Laurence in Roméo et Juliette under Alain Lombard (EMI)

Filmography

Cinema 
1972: Le Droit d'aimer (by Éric Le Hung)
1973: L'Emmerdeur (by Édouard Molinaro) – Louis Randoni
1973: I Don't Know Much, But I'll Say Everything (by Pierre Richard) – General Deglane
1974: Black Thursday (Les Guichets du Louvre) (by Michel Mitrani)
1975: Cher Victor (by Robin Davis)
1976: Dracula and Son (Dracula père et fils) (by Édouard Molinaro) – Le majordome 
1976: Le Gang (by Jacques Deray) – Jo
1977: Death of a Corrupt Man (Mort d'un pourri) (by Georges Lautner) – Marcel
1978: Butterfly on the Shoulder (Un papillon sur l'épaule) (by Jacques Deray) – Miguel Carrabo
1978: The Brontë Sisters (by André Téchiné) – Monsieur Hager
1981: For a Cop's Hide (Pour la peau d'un flic) (by Alain Delon) – Kasper
1985: Carmen with Glyndebourne Opera conducted by Bernard Haitink – Zuniga.

Television 
1968: Le Bourgeois gentilhomme (TV Movie, by Pierre Badel) – le Grand Turc
1970: L'élixir du R.P. Gaucher (by Pierre Badel) – le prieur à la voix de ténor
1971: L'Homme qui rit (by Jean Kerchbron) – Ursus
1972: Mauprat (by Jacques Trébouta) – Marcasse / Narcisse
1972: The Accursed Kings (by Claude Barma) – Jacques de Molay
1973: Vogue la galère (TV Movie, by Raymond Rouleau) – Comité
1974: Beau-François (by Roger Kahane) – Pingre #9 
1982: Le Voyageur imprudent (by Pierre Tchernia) – Méphisto
1984: Les Enquêtes du commissaire Maigret (Episode: "Maigret à Vichy", by Alain Levent) – Le commissaire Lecoeur
1991: Marie Curie, une femme honorable (by Michel Boisrond) – Anatole France (final appearance)

Cartoons 
1978: La Ballade des Dalton (by René Goscinny and Morris) – The cowboy who dodges the train (voice)

Theatre 
 1974: Les Aventures de Tom Jones by Jean Marsan and  after Henry Fielding, directed by René Clermont, Théâtre de Paris

References

External links 
 Xavier Depraz on Art lyrique.fr
 
 Xavier Depraz on Forum opéra
 Biography on Music Me
 Discography on Discogs
 Xavier Depraz – Eugène Onéguine (YouTube)

1926 births
1994 deaths
People from Albert, Somme
20th-century French male actors
French basses
Conservatoire de Paris alumni
Academic staff of the Conservatoire de Paris
20th-century French male opera singers